Piresiella is a genus of Cuban bamboo in the grass family. The only known species is Piresiella strephioides, found in palm savannahs and streambanks in the lowlands of western Cuba.

References

Bambusoideae genera
Endemic flora of Cuba
Grasses of North America
Monotypic Poaceae genera
Bambusoideae